Fine Living may refer to:
Fine Living (European TV channel), a European television channel, owned and operated by Scripps Networks Interactive
Fine Living (Italy), an Italian television channel, owned and operated by Scripps Networks Interactive

See also
Cooking Channel, formerly Fine Living in the United States
DIY Network (Canada), formerly Fine Living in Canada